Shorea acuminatissima (called, along with some other species in the genus Shorea, yellow meranti) is a species of tree in the family Dipterocarpaceae. It is endemic to Borneo and threatened by habitat loss.

References

acuminatissima
Endemic flora of Borneo
Trees of Borneo
Taxonomy articles created by Polbot
Flora of the Borneo lowland rain forests